Greenwood Presbyterian Church, now known as the Good Shepherd Presbyterian Church, is a historic church at 103 W. Denver Street in Greenwood, Arkansas.  The congregation was organized in 1853, and this vernacular Gothic Revival building was built in 1922 as its second sanctuary.  It has a roughly rectangular shape, with stuccoed walls and a hip roof that is pierced on each side by a large clapboarded gable.  Adjacent to the building is a free-standing open belltower, which features a Christian fish element in its upper portion.  It is topped by a small gabled roof with a pointed spire at the center.

The building was listed on the National Register of Historic Places in 2008.

See also
National Register of Historic Places listings in Sebastian County, Arkansas

References

Presbyterian churches in Arkansas
Churches on the National Register of Historic Places in Arkansas
Gothic Revival church buildings in Arkansas
Churches completed in 1922
Churches in Sebastian County, Arkansas
National Register of Historic Places in Sebastian County, Arkansas